Juan Torres (born 23 June 1936) is a Cuban weightlifter. He competed in the men's lightweight event at the 1960 Summer Olympics.

References

External links
 

1936 births
Living people
Cuban male weightlifters
Olympic weightlifters of Cuba
Weightlifters at the 1960 Summer Olympics
Sportspeople from Havana
Pan American Games medalists in weightlifting
Pan American Games gold medalists for Cuba
Weightlifters at the 1959 Pan American Games
20th-century Cuban people
21st-century Cuban people